

Holidays 

May 30 mother´s day

Variable dates

2020
Holy Thursday: April 9
Good Friday: April 10
Easter: April 12
2021
Holy Thursday: April 1
Good Friday: April 2
Easter: April 4
2022
Holy Thursday: April 14
Good Friday: April 15
Easter: April 17
2023
Holy Thursday: April 6
Good Friday: April 7
Easter: April 9
2024
Holy Thursday: March 28
Good Friday: March 29
Easter: March 31
2025
Holy Thursday: April 17
Good Friday: April 18
Easter: April 200

References

 
Nicaragua
Holidays